The 1983 World Juniors Track Cycling Championships were the ninth annual Junior World Championships for track cycling held in Whanganui, New Zealand in August 1983.

The Championships had five events for men only: Sprint, Points race, Individual pursuit, Team pursuit and 1 kilometre time trial.

Events

Medal table

References

UCI Juniors Track World Championships
1983 in track cycling
1983 in New Zealand sport